Xinchang is a rural town in Jingzhou Miao and Dong Autonomous County, Hunan, China. The town is bordered to the northwest by Outuan Township, to the east by Xianxi Town, to the south by Boyang Town, to the west by Pingcha Town, and to the northeast by Quyang Town.

History
In 1995 it was upgraded to a town.

Administrative division
As of 2017, the town is divided into sixteen villages: Xinchang, Paotuan, Yaojia, Mujia, Xiaoduan, Jinxing, Huangpu, Shanli, Heping, Qintuan, Shaotuan, Yantuan, Dijiao, Chongnen, Yingzhai, Baya, and one community: Xinchang Community.

Geography
The Sixiang River passes through the town.

The Dingdong Reservoir is the largest body of water in the town.

Mountains located adjacent to and visible from the townsite are: Mount Jian and Mount Lujiapo.

Economy
The local economy is primarily based upon agriculture and local industry. The main crops are rice, sweet potato and maize.

Attractions
The landscape of the water-eroded cave is a famous scenic spot in the town.

References

Towns of Huaihua
Jingzhou Miao and Dong Autonomous County